The Château de Puyferrat is a château in Saint-Astier, Dordogne, Nouvelle-Aquitaine, France.

Châteaux in Dordogne
Monuments historiques of Dordogne